Heinz von Loesch (born 20 May 1959) is a German musicologist. He researches and teaches at the Technical University Berlin.

Life 

At first he completed a cello study with Gerhard Mantel and Pierre Fournier, which he furthered with the artistic maturity examination in 1983. From 1980 to 1985 he was a member of the Junge Deutsche Philharmonie. At the same time he studied musicology with Carl Dahlhaus and Helga de la Motte-Haber at the Technical University of Berlin until 1991, where he received his doctorate in 1991 and his habilitation in 1999. Afterwards he was a research assistant at the State Institute for Music Research and then also professor at the Technical University of Berlin.

Publications  
 Das Cellokonzert von Beethoven bis Ligeti. Ästhetische und kompositionsgeschichtliche Wandlungen einer musikalischen Gattung, Phil. Diss. Berlin 1991, Frankfurt. 1992.
 Robert Schumann: Konzert für Violoncello und Orchester a-Moll op. 129, Munich 1998 (Meisterwerke der Musik 64).
 Der Werkbegriff in der protestantischen Music theory des 16. und 17. Jahrhunderts: Ein Mißverständnis, Hildesheim etc. 2001 (Studies on the History of Music Theory 1).
 Das Beethoven-Lexikon, edited by Heinz von Loesch and Claus Raab, Laaber 2008.

References

External links 
 
 Heinz von Loesch in WorldCat

Musicologists from Berlin
20th-century German musicologists
21st-century German musicologists
Academic staff of the Technical University of Berlin
1959 births
Living people
Writers from Frankfurt